La sombra del otro ("The Shadow of the Other") is a 1957 Mexican film. It was produced by Fernando de Fuentes.

References

External links 
 

1957 films
Mexican action comedy-drama films
1950s Spanish-language films
1950s Mexican films